Ho is the capital city of the Ho Municipal District and the Volta Region of Ghana. The city lies between Mount Adaklu and Mount Galenukui or Togo Atakora Range, and is home to the Volta Regional Museum, a cathedral, and a prison. It was formerly the administrative capital of British Togoland now part of the Volta Region. The population of Ho Municipality according to the 2010 Population and Housing Census is 177,281 representing 8.4 percent of the region's total population. Females constitute 52.7 percent and males represent 47.3 percent.  About 62 percent of the population resides in urban localities. The Municipality shares boundaries with Adaklu and Agotime-Ziope Districts to the South, Ho West District to the North and West and the Republic of Togo to the East (see Figure 1.1). Its total land area is 2,361 square kilometers (912 sq mi) thus representing 11.5 percent of the region's total land area.

History
Ho was a part of the German colony of Togoland until World War I, when it was occupied by the British. Ho later became the capital of the League of Nations mandate of British Togoland until that entity's incorporation into the British Gold Coast colony, which subsequently became Ghana. The town was initially inhabited by the people of Hegbe (now Heve), followed by the people of Banakoe (now corrupted to Bankoe). These two groups lived alongside each other with individual chiefdoms. The first known chief of the Bankoe people was Afede Asor I, known in his private life as Akorli.  The chief of Heve was Anikpi I, who was known in his private life as Amexo Doh (Adzah Doh). The Ahoe and Dome joined the settlement at a later stage but came to play leading roles in its development.The people of Dome(of Akan origin) became the ruling class until the emergence of modern-day chieftaincy which they ceded to the Bankoe people.The people of Hliha are a sub-group of Bankoe.

Major areas
Ho Bankoe, Ho Dome, Ho Heve, Ho Hliha, Ho Ahoe, Ho Fiave, Anlokordzi, Anagokordzi, Little Bethlehem, Voradep village, Barracks new town, Somey down, Lokoe, Godokpoe, Housing, Ssnit Flats, Awatidome, Dave, Hoƒedo, Mawuli Estate, Powerhouse, Ho Kpevele, Donorkordzi, Executive Gardens.

Surrounding towns and villages
Ziavi,
Klefe,
Shia,
Tokokoe,
Taviefe,
Atikpui,
Nyive,
Hodzo,
Tanyigbe,
Akrofu,
Hoviepe, 
Akoepe,
Kpenoe,
Sokode,
Juapong

Climate
Temperatures are generally high throughout the year which is good for crop farming.   

The rainfall pattern in Ho is characterized by two rainy seasons referred to as the major and the minor seasons. The major season begins from March to June while the minor season is from July to November.

Attractions
The traditional festival in Ho is the Asogli Yam Festival, which is celebrated around September of every year. Ho has a lively and huge open market that attracts people from all over the Volta Region and migrants from Togo. There are numerous churches in the Ho municipality, including the cathedral of the Roman Catholic Diocese of Ho. The Evangelical Presbyterian Church of Ghana has its headquarters in Ho. The church is predominantly in the Volta Region, the capital of which is Ho. The University of Health and Allied Sciences which was established in 2015 is located in Ho.

Sports
Ho Sports Stadium is also located in the town.

Transport
In central parts of Ho, the roads are paved, the roads outside are not. An airport is being built to serve Ho; construction began in September 2015.

Healthcare
The town is home to three hospitals, including the Ho Teaching Hospital, inaugurated in the year 2019, Ho Municipal Hospital as major hospitals serving cities in the environs. There are also numerous clinics that serve the town.

Education
There are many private and public basic schools in Ho. A list of tertiary institutions in Ho follows:

Ho currently has one of the best innovation hubs in Ghana. Node Eight is a digital innovation hub that invests in young African innovators and startups building the future. Over the past few years, Node Eight Hub through the help of partnership program has been able to develop a couple of resources.

Tertiary institutions
University of Health and Allied Sciences 
Ho Technical University, formally Ho Polytechnic
Ghana Technology University College,
Princefield University College
Evangelical Presbyterian University College
Ho Nurses Training Schools (Community Health & RGN)
DataLink Institute, Ho 
Gcom Institute of Science and Technology

Secondary education
Mawuli School
 EPC Mawuko Girls Senior High School@Ho
OLA Girls' Senior High School
Sacred Heart Senior High School
Sonrise Christian High School
St. Prosper's college
Wallahs Academy
Holy Spirit College of Education

See also
British Togoland

References

External links
 Information on Ho and the Volta Region (hoinghana.com)
 Ghana-pedia reference – Ho
 The HO MUSEUM / english & german

Populated places in the Volta Region
Regional capitals in Ghana